The Belmont Hotel is a twelve-story residential hi-rise built as a hotel on the capitol square in Madison, Wisconsin in 1924. At that time it was the tallest building near the capitol and concern that it blocked the view prompted height-limit restrictions that are still in place. In 1990 the building was placed on the National Register of Historic Places.

History
Madison's first hotel was the American House, built in 1838 on the capitol square where the American Exchange Bank now stands. Over the years other hotels sprang up around town: downtown hotels for legislators and salesmen, resort hotels on the lakeshores, and railroad hotels near the depots. The early 1900s saw growth of state government, the UW, industry, conventions, and auto tourism. All of these drove a need for more lodging space, and a brief boom in hotel construction. The Belmont was one result, along with the Hotel Loraine and an expansion of the Park Hotel.

After growing up on his father's farm west of Madison, Charles Piper joined a grocery business in 1892, and eventually bought full control of it. He brought in his brother Samuel and they expanded the store into a chain of retail grocery stores. They brought in two more Piper brothers, and added a motorized delivery service in 1904. In 1910 the Pipers moved one of their stores into the Joseph Kaiser Fair Store at Mifflin and Pinckney, on the square where the Belmont Hotel now stands. Across the street they bought the F.A. Ogden Block, an old 5-story building with stores at street level and the Madison Hotel above. The Pipers renamed it the Belmont Hotel and H.H. Hile ran it for them successfully, while the Pipers also ran a cafeteria in the same building. By the 1920s the era of the grocery store on capitol square was passing and in place of their grocery store, they all decided to build a bigger, modern, New Belmont Hotel - a moderately-priced commercial hotel right on the square.

The Piper brothers financed the $400,000 project largely through the sale of first mortgage bonds to local investors, including many farmers. Madison architects Balch & Grover designed the new Belmont tower in Neoclassical style, with the whole tower suggesting one classical column. I.e. the basement, first floor and mezzanine are clad in limestone, suggesting the base of the column. The next eight stories are clad in red brick, suggesting the shaft of the column. Limestone decoration that contrasts with the brick connects the windows into vertical lines, suggesting fluting on the column. The eleventh floor is framed by a metal entablature below and a cornice above - the head of the column. The building's framework is reinforced concrete and interior walls are hollow clay tile - a fireproof design which was fairly new at the time. The structure was built from 1923 to 1924 by Baily & Kasson Company of Chicago. Inside, the hotel had 200 small rooms arranged so that each pair shared a bathtub to save space. The hotel opened with a flower shop in the lobby and the Old English Room restaurant in the basement, and charged between $2.00 and $3.00 per night for a room.

The height of the New Belmont Hotel stirred controversy. Up to this point, the tallest building near the capitol had been the 9-story Gay building at 16 N Carroll St - now renamed the Churchill building.  When built in 1915, the Gay was Madison's first "skyscraper." However, the Madison Art League and City Planner John Nolan were concerned that some day tall buildings would hem in the capitol and obstruct the view of its beautiful and symbolic dome. Similar debates were occurring in many cities at the dawn of the era of skyscrapers:  should we let the towering rectangles of modern commerce hide and overshadow our dear old civic institutions - our graceful government buildings and churches? In response to the Gay building, anti-skyscraper forces pushed for legislation to limit the height of buildings around the capitol square, but the attorney general "ruled that the state could only regulate construction on the basis of health and safety, not aesthetics." Plans for the new Belmont reignited this debate and the anti-skyscraper forces managed to pass legislation imposing a 90-foot height limit on buildings near the capitol. This time the rule was upheld by the Wisconsin Supreme Court, and the 90-foot limit remains to this day, leaving the 284-foot capitol dome prominent on Madison's skyline.

The Belmont's designers, Harold Charles Balch and Grover Henry Lippert, were sons of Neillsville, Wisconsin who took different paths into architecture, but ended up in partnership with J.O. Gordon in Madison. Some of their other buildings are the 1917 Prairie Style-ish Madison Waterworks at 311 N Hancock St, the 1924 Georgian Revival-style Alpha Gamma Delta Sorority House at 220 Lakelawn Pl, the 1925 Tudor Revival-style Koch house at 2316 Eton Ridge, the 1927 Halperin building at 434 State St, the 1928 Tudor Revival Westgate Apartments at 2019 University Ave, the 1930 Neoclassical-style Dr. Bertrand Building at 320 State St, the 1930 Art Deco Osborn building at 310 State St, the 1935 Colonial Revival Pribnow house at 1114 Spaight St, the 1937 Arte Moderne-style Lyon Apartments at 330 N Carroll St, the 1937 Buenzli house at 1345 Rutledge, and the 1938 Vogel Brothers apartment at 2306 Kendall Ave.

The Belmont functioned as a hotel into the 1960s, owned by the Piper family. In 1968 the YWCA bought the building, and began a $300,000 renovation, which added a twelfth floor swimming pool on top of the building, among other changes.

See also
List of tallest buildings in Madison

References

Neoclassical architecture in Wisconsin
Apartment buildings in Wisconsin
Residential buildings on the National Register of Historic Places in Wisconsin
Hotel buildings on the National Register of Historic Places in Wisconsin
National Register of Historic Places in Madison, Wisconsin
Skyscrapers in Madison, Wisconsin
Residential skyscrapers in Wisconsin